Assembly Hall is a heritage-listed community hall at 8 Locke Street, Warwick, Southern Downs Region, Queensland, Australia. It was added to the Queensland Heritage Register on 21 August 1992, but its heritage listing is currently under review.

References

Attribution

External links 

Queensland Heritage Register
Warwick, Queensland
Community buildings in Queensland
Articles incorporating text from the Queensland Heritage Register